Frederic S. Lee may refer to:

 Frederic Schiller Lee (1859–1939), American physiologist
 Frederic Sterling Lee (1949–2014), American economist